Burradon is a village and former civil parish, now in the parish of Netherton, in Northumberland, England. In 1951 the parish had a population of 53.

Governance 
Burradon is in the parliamentary constituency of Berwick-upon-Tweed. Burradon was formerly a township in Alwinton parish, from 1866 Burradon was a civil parish in its own right until it was abolished on 1 April 1955 and merged with Netherton.

References

Villages in Northumberland
Former civil parishes in Northumberland